Walk off the Earth is a Canadian indie pop band from Burlington, Ontario. The group is known for its music videos of covers and originals. The band is well known for covering pop-genre music on YouTube, making use of instruments such as the ukulele and the theremin, as well as looping samples. The band's recorded music and videos are produced by member and multi-instrumentalist Gianni "Luminati" Nicassio.

History
Walk off the Earth was formed in 2006 in Burlington, Ontario, Canada. The band began releasing music independently and created a variety of cover versions of songs including The Gregory Brothers. In early 2012, the band's live cover of Gotye's "Somebody That I Used to Know" on YouTube gathered over 175 million views in a mere four months, receiving positive reviews from both Gotye and his co-singer on the song, Kimbra. The band released an accompanying video in which all five members are shown playing on the same guitar simultaneously. The production was taken from the 26th cut of a 14-hour session. Ellen DeGeneres featured the band on her January 23, 2012, show where they played live, again on one guitar; the group was also included in YouTube Rewind 2012 "Rewind YouTube Style 2012", doing a part of its one-guitar acoustic version of "Gangnam Style".

In February 2012, the band signed a recording contract with Columbia Records. The members appeared in the Season 4 premiere of CTV's The Listener, performing two songs and socializing with the main characters in the bar. They also covered "Rude" by Magic!, "Hello" by Adele, "Party Rock Anthem" by LMFAO, "Payphone" by Maroon 5, and "Roll Up" by Wiz Khalifa.

At this time, singer Sarah Blackwood, who had joined the band in late 2011, was also the singer and guitarist for fellow Ontario based band The Creepshow. The Creepshow had announced a tour of Europe and North America for the late summer - including dates in the United Kingdom in August.  However, Walk Off The Earth soon announced a tour of their own with conflicting dates, and on July 16, Blackwood uploaded a farewell video to her YouTube page, announcing she was leaving The Creepshow.  Blackwood went on to join Walk Off The Earth on a permanent basis, starting with their Autumn tour and EP, R.E.V.O..

In December 2012, Walk off the Earth released an original single titled "Gang of Rhythm". The group uploaded a cover of Taylor Swift's "I Knew You Were Trouble" to YouTube in January 2013, with four of the five band members and guest beatboxer KRNFX using only vocals.

On March 11, 2013, Rolling Stone streamed their unreleased R.E.V.O. album in its entirety. The full-length R.E.V.O. album was released on March 19, 2013, after which they commenced in the R.E.V.O. Tour through the US and Europe. They began another US and Europe tour, Gang of Rhythm, in 2014. The most recent tour was the Sing It All Away tour through Europe and North America, which began in 2015. The band's YouTube video of Lorde's "Royals" was featured in the 2014 Grammy Awards. The band's original single "Gang of Rhythm" was chosen as the theme song for the Catalan TV show El Foraster. The group was also featured on the soundtrack of the 2015 animated film Snowtime!, performing the song "You're My Sweater". Walk off the Earth won a 2016 Juno award for Group of the Year.

The band's video of "Issues" was filmed with The Next Step dancers Briar Nolet and Myles Erlick, and was featured in Dance Spirit magazine. In August 2017, the band's single "Fire in My Soul" was certified gold. Walk off the Earth performed during the half-time show of the NFL playoff game, January 14, 2018, Minnesota Vikings vs. New Orleans Saints.

On December 30, 2018, it was announced that band member Mike "Beard Guy" Taylor had died from natural causes. He was 51 years old. Walk Off the Earth subsequently cancelled their scheduled performance at the Niagara Falls New Year's Eve Canadian Broadcasting Corporation television special, a performance that was to open their 2019 world tour. On January 7, 2019 the group announced a free memorial and tribute concert for Taylor. Presented by the city of Burlington and the Sound of Music Festival, family, friends and fans came together to celebrate Taylor's life and legacy on January 13 at Civic Square in Downtown Burlington. Special guests such as Scott Helman, members of Barenaked Ladies and more performed at the event, which was live-streamed by CBC Music. On January 16, 2019, the band announced it would be continuing on its 2019 tour. In a video posted to their social media pages, the four members thanked their family, friends, and fans, stating that their tour would be devoted to honoring Taylor's memory. At the same time Marshall has written the theme song to the animated comedy series Corn & Peg for Chris Hamilton, Nelvana and Corus Entertainment. Walk off the Earth sang "O Canada" at game 4 of the 2019 NBA Finals in Oakland, where the Toronto Raptors played the Golden State Warriors.

In December 2019, Ryan Marshall announced that he was going to be leaving the band on Twitter and Instagram.

In April 2020, Deadline announced that the band wrote and performed the theme song, "The Journey Starts Today", for the English dub of "Pokémon Journeys: The Series". In November 2020, they collaborated with Canadian country singer Brett Kissel on "A Few Good Stories".

On June 9, 2021 Walk Off the Earth released "Love You Right" as the lead single from their upcoming sixth studio album. "Love You Right" would mark their first collaboration with Grammy nominated Danish group Lukas Graham. The single received over a million streams in less than a week. The accompanying music video was directed by Chris Di Staulo.

The band released their sixth studio album, "Meet You There", across all digital music platforms on July 22, 2021.

On August 9, 2021, Walk Off the Earth partnered with Amazon Music for a performance from atop Toronto’s CN Tower to be live-streamed on Amazon’s Twitch channel. The live stream event was the first performance of the bands newly released sixth studio album.

On September 24, 2021 the band released their first original 7-track children’s album, Romeo Eats Vol. 1 via Golden Carrot Records/The Orchard. The album arrived alongside the group's children’s companion web series, "Romeo Eats," a food discovery show hosted by Walk Off the Earth lead singer Gianni Luminati and his 3-year-old son Romeo. Each "Romeo Eats" episode shows Romeo trying new foods, and includes an original song produced by Walk Off the Earth that features the explored food in question. The songs were subsequently released on album as Walk Off the Earth & Romeo Eats, Vol. 1; the album's Juno Award nomination for Children's Album of the Year at the Juno Awards of 2022 made Romeo the youngest Juno nominee in the entire history of the awards.

On March 18, 2022 Walk off the Earth recruited D Smoke, who had appeared in Netflix’s Rhythm + Flow, for their anthem, “Bet On Me”.

In the summer of 2022, Walk off the Earth returned on July 8 with the release of their latest single, “Back in Bed".

Members
Current members
Gianni "Luminati" Nicassio – vocals, bass, guitar, ukulele, drums, percussion, banjo, mandolin, cello, glockenspiel, kalimba, harmonica, keyboards, double bass (2006–present)
Joel Cassady – drums, percussion, vocals, ukulele, keyboards, guitar, bass, kalimba, sampler (2011–present)
Sarah Blackwood – vocals, ukulele, guitar, percussion, glockenspiel, keyboards, bass, mandolin (2011–present)
David "Tokyo" Speirs – percussion, trumpet, flute, drums, bass (touring musician 2016–2020, full band member 2020–present)

Touring musicians
Lee Williamson – guitar, banjo, bass, mandolin, ukulele
Zach Gerber – drums, guitar, bass, vocals, percussion
Adam Michael – guitar, keyboards, bass (touring musician 2016 – present)

Past members
Pete Kirkwood – drums, vocals, percussion (2006–2010)
Mike "Beard Guy" Taylor – piano, organ, keyboards, trumpet, euphonium, kazoo, accordion, melodica, didgeridoo, glockenspiel, percussion, vocals, (2010–2018; died 2018)
Ryan Marshall – vocals, guitar, bass, harmonica, trumpet, ukulele, percussion, keyboards (2006–2019)

Timeline

Awards and nominations

Discography

Studio albums

Extended plays

Singles

As lead artist

As featured artist

References

External links

 
 

2006 establishments in Ontario
Canadian alternative rock groups
Canadian indie rock groups
Juno Award for Group of the Year winners
Musical groups established in 2006
Musical groups from the Regional Municipality of Halton
Musical quintets
Reggae fusion groups